Charles Simons may refer to:

People
 Charles Casper Simons (1876–1964), American judge
 Charles Earl Simons, Jr. (1916–1999), American judge
 Charles Simons (footballer) (1906–1979), Belgian footballer

Other
 Charles E. Simons Jr. Federal Court House

See also
 Charles Simon (disambiguation)
 Charles Simmons (disambiguation)